Sir Michael Foster (1689–1763) was an English judge.

Life
Foster was the son of Michael Foster, an attorney, and was born at Marlborough, Wiltshire, on 16 December 1689. After attending the free school of his native town, he matriculated at Exeter College, Oxford, 7 May 1705. He does not appear to have taken any degree. He was admitted a student of the Middle Temple on 23 May 1707, and was called to the bar in May 1713. Meeting with little success in London, he retired to Marlborough, whence he afterwards removed to Bristol, where as a local counsel he gained a great reputation. In August 1735 he was chosen recorder of Bristol, and in Easter term 1736 became a Serjeant-at-law. He held the post of recorder for many years, and upon his resignation in 1764 was succeeded by Daines Barrington. During Foster's tenure of office several important cases came before him. In the case of Captain Samuel Goodere who was tried for the murder of his brother, Sir John Dineley Goodere, 2nd Baronet, in 1741, the right of the city of Bristol to try capital offences committed within its jurisdiction was fully established.

The Broadfoot Case
When Alexander Broadfoot was indicted for the murder of Cornelius Calahan, a sailor in the king's service, who boarded the merchantman to which Broadfoot belonged, and was killed in an attempt to press the prisoner for the Navy, Foster delivered an elaborate judgment in support of the legality of impressment, being convinced that "the right of impressing mariners for the publick service is a prerogative inherent in the crown, grounded upon common law, and recognised by many acts of parliament". He, however, directed the jury to find Broadfoot guilty of manslaughter only, as Calahan had acted without legal warrant.

Later career and encomiums
Upon the recommendation of Lord Chancellor Hardwicke, Foster was appointed a puisne judge of the King's Bench in succession to Sir William Chapple (c.1676-1745) of Upwey. He was knighted on 21 April, and took his seat in court for the first time on 1 May 1745. During the eighteen years he sat in the king's bench he maintained a high character for his learning as well as for his integrity and independence of judgment.

Many years later, Lord Chief Justice De Grey declared that Foster might "be truly called the Magna Charta of liberty of persons as well as fortunes",  while Sir William Blackstone pronounced him to be a very great master of the crown law. Thurlow, in a letter dated 11 April 1758, alluded in high terms to Foster's independent conduct in the trial of an indictment for a nuisance in obstructing a common footway through Richmond Park, of which Princess Amelia was then the ranger, and Churchill in his Rosciad sums up Foster's character in one word:
"Each judge was true and steady to his trust, As Mansfield wise, and as old Foster just".

Death and family
Foster died on 7 November 1763, in the seventy-fourth year of his age, and was buried in the parish church of Stanton Drew in Somersetshire, where a monument was erected to his memory. In 1725 he married Martha, the eldest daughter of James Lyde of Stantonwick, Somersetshire. She died on 15 May 1758. There were no children of the marriage. An engraving by James Basire, from an original picture of Foster, then in the possession of Mrs. Dodson, forms the frontispiece to his Life.

Works
He was the author of the following works:
A Letter of Advice to Protestant Dissenters, 1720.
An Examination of the Scheme of Church Power laid down in the Codex Juris Ecclesiastici Anglicani, &c., anon., London, 1735, 8vo; the second edition, corrected, London, 1735, 8vo; the third edition, corrected, London, 1736, 8vo; the fifth edition, corrected, Dublin, 1763, 8vo. A reprint of the third edition was published in No. vii. of Tracts for the People, designed to vindicate Religious and Christian Liberty, London, 1840, 8vo.
The Case of the King against Alexander Broadfoot … 30 August 1743, Oxford, 1758, 4to. 
A Report of some Proceedings on the Commission of Oyer and Terminer and Gaol Delivery for the Trial of the Rebels in the year 1746 in the County of Surry, and of other Crown Cases. To which are added Discourses upon a few Branches of the Crown Law, Oxford, 1762, fol.; a pirated edition, Dublin, 1767, 8vo; the second edition, corrected, with additional notes and references by his nephew, Michael Dodson, esq., of the Middle Temple, London, 1776, 8vo; the third edition, with an appendix, containing new cases, with additional notes and references by his nephew, Michael Dodson, esq., barrister-at-law, London, 1792, 8vo.

References

1689 births
1763 deaths
People from Wiltshire
18th-century English judges
English knights
Alumni of Exeter College, Oxford